Lazar Kojić (born 11 December 1999) is a Serbian professional footballer who plays for Proleter Novi Sad, as a midfielder.

Career
Born in Belgrade, Kojić began his career at FK Brodarac before signing for Dutch club Fortuna Sittard in January 2018. He had loan spells back in Serbia with OFK Bačka and Radnik Surdulica, before signing for Proleter Novi Sad in August 2020.

He has also played for the Serbian under-19 team.

References

1999 births
Living people
Serbian footballers
FK Brodarac players
Fortuna Sittard players
OFK Bačka players
FK Radnik Surdulica players
FK Proleter Novi Sad players
Eerste Divisie players
Serbian SuperLiga players
Association football midfielders
Serbian expatriate footballers
Serbian expatriate sportspeople in the Netherlands
Expatriate footballers in the Netherlands
Serbia youth international footballers